Dasyrhicnoessa is a genus of beach flies in the family Canacidae (formally Tethinidae). All known species are Afrotropical, Neotropical, Indomalayan, or Australasian-Oceanian in distribution .

Species
D. adelpha Munari, 1986
D. aquila Munari, 2002
D. atripes Munari, 2004
D. bicolor Munari, 2002
D. boninensis Sasakawa, 1995
D. celata Munari, 2010
D. ciliata Munari, 2004
D. clandestina Munari, 2002
D. ferruginea Lamb, 1914
D. fulva Hendel, 1913
D. fulvescens Malloch, 1935
D. humilis Munari, 2004
D. insularis (Aldrich, 1931)
D. longisetosa Munari, 2004
D. macalpinei Munari, 2004
D. mathisi Munari, 2002
D. ostentatrix Munari, 2004
D. pallida Munari, 2004
D. platypes Sasakawa, 1986
D. priapus Munari, 1986
D. serratula Malloch, 1935
D. sexseriata Hendel, 1913
D. tripunctata Sasakawa, 1974
D. vockerothi Hardy and Delfinado, 1980
D. yoshiyasui Munari, 1986

References

Canacidae
Schizophora genera